Arun Kumar is an Indian physician, politician and a member of Uttar Pradesh Legislative Assembly. He represents the Bareilly constituency of Uttar Pradesh and is a member of the Bharatiya Janata Party political party.

Early life and education
Arun Kumar was born in Bareilly district to Girish Chandra, a physician. He attended the King George's Medical University and attained M.B.B.S. degree. He is physician by profession.

Political career
Kumar has been a MLA for two terms. He represented the Bareilly constituency and is a member of the Bharatiya Janata Party political party.

Positions held

See also
 Bareilly (Assembly constituency) 
 Sixteenth Legislative Assembly of Uttar Pradesh
 Uttar Pradesh Legislative Assembly

References 

Bharatiya Janata Party politicians from Uttar Pradesh
Uttar Pradesh MLAs 2012–2017
Uttar Pradesh MLAs 2017–2022
People from Bareilly district
1948 births
Living people
King George's Medical University alumni
University of Lucknow alumni
Politicians from Bareilly
Uttar Pradesh MLAs 2022–2027